The Goodbye Girl is a 1977 film starring Richard Dreyfuss and Marsha Mason.

The Goodbye Girl or Goodbye Girl may also refer to:

 The Goodbye Girl (musical), a 1993 Broadway musical based on the film
 Goodbye Girl (David Gates album)
 "Goodbye Girl" (song), the title song, and the theme song from the 1977 film, later covered by Hootie & the Blowfish
 The Goodbye Girl (album), a 2004 album by Epicure
 Goodbye Girl (Miyuki Nakajima album)
 "Goodbye Girl" (Go West song)
 "Goodbye Girl" (Squeeze song)
 "The Goodbye Girl" (The O.C.), an episode of The O.C.
 The Goodbye Girl (2004 film)